Notholaenic acid is a dihydrostilbenoid found in the farina of some ferns of the genus Notholaena. It has been shown to have anti-HSV-1 (Herpes simplex virus 1) activity at high concentrations in vitro. It was artificially synthesized, starting from 3-benzyloxy-5-methoxybenzyl alcohol, in 1985.

References 

Dihydrostilbenoids